"Remind Me" is the fourth solo single by Australian singer Conrad Sewell. It was released on 5 February 2016 and taken from his debut extended play, All I Know.

The song was used in television commercials, promoting the 2016 season of Home and Away.

Sewell said "The lyric came from missing someone or finishing a relationship or even someone that's just not around anymore in your life. You know, it's love and loss."

A Steve James remix was released on 15 April 2016. A Matvey Emerson remix was released on 6 May 2016.

Music video
The video was released on 18 March 2016.

Charts

References 
 

2016 singles 
2015 songs
Conrad Sewell songs 
Songs written by Conrad Sewell
Songs written by Dave Gibson (Scottish singer-songwriter)